The Pinaceae, or pine family, are conifer trees or shrubs, including many of the well-known conifers of commercial importance such as cedars, firs, hemlocks, larches, pines and spruces. The family is included in the order Pinales, formerly known as Coniferales. Pinaceae are supported as monophyletic by their protein-type sieve cell plastids, pattern of proembryogeny, and lack of bioflavonoids. They are the largest extant conifer family in species diversity, with between 220 and 250 species (depending on taxonomic opinion) in 11 genera, and the second-largest (after Cupressaceae) in geographical range, found in most of the Northern Hemisphere, with the majority of the species in temperate climates, but ranging from subarctic to tropical. The family often forms the dominant component of boreal, coastal, and montane forests. One species, Pinus merkusii, grows just south of the equator in Southeast Asia. Major centres of diversity are found in the mountains of southwest China, Mexico, central Japan, and California.

Description

The embryos of Pinaceae have three to 24 cotyledons.

Seed dispersal is mostly by wind, but some species have large seeds with reduced wings, and are dispersed by birds. Analysis of Pinaceae cones reveals how selective pressure has shaped the evolution of variable cone size and function throughout the family. Variation in cone size in the family has likely resulted from the variation of seed dispersal mechanisms available in their environments over time. All Pinaceae with seeds weighing less than 90 milligrams are seemingly adapted for wind dispersal. Pines having seeds larger than 100 mg are more likely to have benefited from adaptations that promote animal dispersal, particularly by birds. Pinaceae that persist in areas where tree squirrels are abundant do not seem to have evolved adaptations for bird dispersal.

Boreal conifers have many adaptions for winter. The narrow conical shape of northern conifers, and their downward-drooping limbs help them shed snow, and many of them seasonally alter their biochemistry to make them more resistant to freezing, called "hardening".

Classification

Classification of the subfamilies and genera of Pinaceae has been subject to debate in the past. Pinaceae ecology, morphology, and history have all been used as the basis for methods of analyses of the family. An 1891 publication divided the family into two subfamilies, using the number and position of resin canals in the primary vascular region of the young taproot as the primary consideration. In a 1910 publication, the family was divided into two tribes based on the occurrence and type of long–short shoot dimorphism.

A more recent classification divided the subfamilies and genera based on the consideration of features of ovulate cone anatomy among extant and fossil members of the family. Below is an example of how the morphology has been used to classify Pinaceae. 
The 11 genera are grouped into four subfamilies, based on the microscopical anatomy and the morphology of the cones, pollen, wood, seeds, and leaves:

 Subfamily Pinoideae (Pinus): cones are biennial, rarely triennial, with each year's scale-growth distinct, forming an umbo on each scale, the cone scale base is broad, concealing the seeds fully from abaxial (below the phloem vessels) view, the seed is without resin vesicles, the seed wing holds the seed in a pair of claws, leaves have primary stomatal bands adaxial (above the xylem) or equally on both surfaces.
 Subfamily Piceoideae (Picea): cones are annual, without a distinct umbo, the cone scale base is broad, concealing the seeds fully from abaxial view, seed is without resin vesicles, blackish, the seed wing holds the seed loosely in a cup, leaves have primary stomatal bands adaxial (above the xylem) or equally on both surfaces.
 Subfamily Laricoideae (Larix, Pseudotsuga, and Cathaya): cones are annual, without a distinct umbo, the cone scale base is broad, concealing the seeds fully from abaxial view, the seed is without resin vesicles, whitish, the seed wing holds the seed tightly in a cup, leaves have primary stomatal bands abaxial only.
 Subfamily Abietoideae (Abies, Cedrus, Pseudolarix, Keteleeria, Nothotsuga, and Tsuga): cones are annual, without a distinct umbo, the cone scale base is narrow, with the seeds partly visible in abaxial view, the seed has resin vesicles, the seed wing holds the seed tightly in a cup, leaves have primary stomatal bands abaxial only.

Phylogeny 
A revised 2018 phylogeny places Cathaya as sister to the pines rather than in the Laricoidae subfamily with Larix and Pseudotsuga.

Multiple molecular studies indicate that in contrast to previous classifications placing it outside the conifers, Gnetophyta may in fact be the sister group to the Pinaceae, with both lineages having diverged during the early-mid Carboniferous. This is known as the "gnepine" hypothesis.

Evolutionary history 
Pinaceae is estimated to have diverged from other conifer groups during the late Carboniferous ~313 million years ago. Various possible stem-group relatives have been reported from as early as the Late Permian (Lopingian) The extinct conifer cone genus Schizolepidopsis likely represent stem-group members of the Pinaceae, the first good records of which are in the Middle-Late Triassic, with abundant records during the Jurassic across Eurasia. The oldest crown group (descendant of the last common ancestor of all living species) member of Pinaceae is the cone Eathiestrobus, known from the Upper Jurassic (lower Kimmeridgian, 157.3-154.7 million years ago) of Scotland, which likely belongs to the pinoid grouping of the family. Pinaceae rapidly radiated during the Early Cretaceous. Members of the modern genera Pinus (pines), Picea (spruce) and Cedrus (cedar) first appear during the Early Cretaceous. The extinct Cretaceous genera Pseudoaraucaria and Obirastrobus appear to be members of Abietoideae, while Pityostrobus appears to be non-monophyletic, containing many disparately related members of Pinaceae.

Defense mechanisms 
External stresses on plants have the ability to change the structure and composition of forest ecosystems. Common external stress that Pinaceae experience are herbivore and pathogen attack which often leads to tree death. In order to combat these stresses, trees need to adapt or evolve defenses against these stresses. Pinaceae have evolved a myriad of mechanical and chemical defenses, or a combination of the two, in order to protect themselves against antagonists. Pinaceae have the ability to up-regulate a combination of constitutive mechanical and chemical strategies to further their defenses.

Pinaceae defenses are prevalent in the bark of the trees. This part of the tree contributes a complex defensive boundary against external antagonists. Constitutive and induced defenses are both found in the bark.

Constitutive defenses 
Constitutive defenses are typically the first line of defenses used against antagonists and can include sclerified cells, lignified periderm cells, and secondary compounds such as phenolics and resins. Constitutive defenses are always expressed and offer immediate protection from invaders but could also be defeated by antagonists that have evolved adaptations to these defense mechanisms. One of the common secondary compounds used by Pinaceae are phenolics or polyphenols. These secondary compounds are preserved in vacuoles of polyphenolic parenchyma cells (PP) in the secondary phloem.

Induced defenses 
Induced defense responses need to be activated by certain cues, such as herbivore damage or other biotic signals.

A common induced defense mechanism used by Pinaceae is resins. Resins are also one of the primary defenses used against attack. Resins are short term defenses that are composed of a complex combination of volatile mono- (C10) and sesquiterpenes (C15) and nonvolatile diterpene resin acids (C20). They are produced and stored in specialized secretory areas known as resin ducts, resin blisters, or resin cavities. Resins have the ability to wash away, trap, fend off antagonists, and are also involved in wound sealing. They are an effective defense mechanism because they have toxic and inhibitory effects on invaders, such as insects or pathogens. Resins could have developed as an evolutionary defense against bark beetle attacks. One well researched resin present in Pinaceae is oleoresin. Oleoresin had been found to be a valuable part of the conifer defense mechanism against biotic attacks. They are found in secretory tissues in tree stems, roots, and leaves. Oleoresin is also needed in order to classify conifers.

Active research: methyl jasmonate 
The topic of defense mechanisms within family Pinaceae is a very active area of study with numerous studies being conducted. Many of these studies use methyl jasmonate (MJ) as an antagonist. Methyl jasmonate is known to be able to induce defense responses in the stems of multiple Pinaceae species. It has been found that MJ stimulated the activation of PP cells and formation of xylem traumatic resin ducts (TD). These are structures that are involved in the release of phenolics and resins, both forms of defense mechanism.

References

External links

 Arboretum de Villardebelle French Arboretum of conifers around the world 
 Gymnosperm Database – Pinaceae
 Pinaceae on the web page of the Tree-of-Life project
 40 Pine Trees From Around the World by The Spruce
 , covers Californian species and much of western North America
 Pinaceae in Flora of North America
 Pinus in USDA Plants Database

 
Pinales families